The characterization  gas collecting tube describes  an oblong gas-tight container with one valve at either end. Usually such a container has a gauged volume, has a cylindrical shape and is made of glass. Gas collecting tubes are used for science-related purposes; for taking samples of gases.

Versions

 Gas collecting tubes, made of glass, with 2 stopcocks with glass plugs, without septum
 as above, with septum
 with PTFE plug, without septum
 as above, with septum

Capacity of gas collecting tubes 150, 250, 350, 500 and 1.000 ml

Measurement of the Mass Density of a Gas - Aspirator Method 
The mass density of a gas can be measured by using a gas collecting tube, an analytical balance  and an aspirator.  The mass and volume of a displaced amount of gas are determined: At atmospheric pressure , the gas collecting tube is filled with the gas to be investigated and the overall mass   is measured. Then the aspirator sucks out much of  the gas yielding a second overall mass  measurement. (The difference of masses represents the mass of the extracted amount of gas.) Finally, the nearly evacuated gas collecting tube is allowed to suck in an outgassed liquid, usually previously heated water, which is offered under atmospheric pressure . The gas collecting tube is weighed for a third and last time containing the liquid yielding the value . (The difference of masses of the nearly evacuated tube and the liquid-containing tube gives the mass of the sucked-in  liquid, that took the place of the extracted amount of gas.) The given mass-density  of the liquid permits to calculate the displaced volume. Thus giving mass  and volume  of the extracted amount of gas, consequently accessing its mass density under atmospheric pressure.

Measurement of the Mass Density of a Gas - Two Fluid Method 
The mass density of a fluid can be measured by using a gas collecting tube, an analytical balance and two other fluids of known mass densities, preferably a gas and a liquid (with mass densities). Overview: First, mass measurements get the volume  and the evacuated mass  of  the gas collecting tube; secondly, these two are used to measure and calculate the mass-density  of the investigated fluid.

Fill the gas collecting tube with one of those fluids of given mass density and measure the overall mass, do the same with the second one giving the two mass values , . Consequently, for those two fluids, the definition of mass density can be rewritten:

These two equations with two unknowns  and  can be solved by using elementary algebra:

(The relative error of the result significantly depends on the relative proportions of the given mass densities and the measured masses.)

Now fill the gas collecting tube with the fluid to be investigated. Measure the overall mass  to calculate the mass of the fluid inside the tube  yielding the desired mass density .

Molar Mass from the Mass Density of a Gas
If the gas is a pure gaseous chemical substance (and not a mixture), with the mass density ,  then using the ideal gas law permits to calculate the molar mass  of the gaseous chemical substance: 
 

Where  represents the universal gas constant,  the absolute temperature at which the measurements took place.

References

External links
 Source of the notion "gas collecting tube", among others

Measuring instruments
Laboratory equipment
Laboratory glassware